The blue-collared parrot (Geoffroyus simplex) also known as simple parrot, lilac-collared song parrot, or lilac-collared Geoffroy's parrot, is a parrot found in the higher elevations of New Guinea. It is found from 500 to 2300 m, mainly between 800 and 1900 m (though food shortages will send them lower). It is 23–25 cm, mainly green with a black beak, yellow wing bend, blue underwing coverts, and a pale yellow iris. Adult males have a blue collar across upper breast to lower neck above the mantle, adult females have some blue on the rear crown. Juveniles have no blue and a paler bill. There are two subspecies:
 G. s. simplex: On Vogelkop. 23 cm
 G. s. buergersi: On rest of island. 25 cm, collar on males is duller but wider in back.

It inhabits humid hill forest and forest edges. Flocks are up to 200.

References
   
Juniper & Parr (1998) Parrots: A Guide to Parrots of the World; .

blue-collared parrot
Birds of New Guinea
blue-collared parrot